"El Amante" is a song by American singer Nicky Jam from his fourth studio album, Fénix (2017). Written by Jam, Juan Vélez, and its producer Saga WhiteBlack, the track was released by Sony Music Latin on January 16, 2017, as the fourth single from the album. A remix with Ozuna and Bad Bunny was released on June 26, 2017.

Music video
The music video for "El Amante" was released on January 15, 2017, and has received over 1.3 billion views on YouTube.

Charts

Weekly charts

Year-end charts

Decade-end charts

Certifications

See also
List of Billboard number-one Latin songs of 2017

References

2017 singles
2017 songs
Nicky Jam songs
Songs written by Nicky Jam
Sony Music Latin singles
Spanish-language songs